Terra Boa is a municipality in the micro-region of Campo Mourão in the Brazilian state of Paraná. The population is 17,200 (2020 est.) in an area of 320.85 km². The elevation is 825 m.  The neighbouring municipalities are Cianorte, Engenheiro Beltrão, Jussara and Peabiru.

References

External links
http://www.citybrazil.com.br/pr/terraboa (in Portuguese)

Municipalities in Paraná